Ted Curtis Johnson (born December 4, 1972) is a former American football player in the National Football League (NFL). He grew up in Carlsbad, California where he graduated from Carlsbad High School in 1991. From there he attended the University of Colorado and was drafted by the Patriots in the second round of the 1995 NFL Draft with the 57th overall selection.

Playing career

In his ten-year professional career, Johnson played in 125 regular season games and recorded 763 tackles, 11.5 sacks, one interception, 16 passes defensed, six forced fumbles, and seven fumble recoveries. He was noted for his ability to generate many tackles and for his smart play at the linebacker position. He also was able to make an impact for the Patriots without tackling the ballcarrier, as former Fox Network analyst and NFL player Matt Millen states, "What you didn't see is Ted Johnson stoning the guard, getting off the guard, taking on the fullback and freeing up (Todd) Collins to make the tackle. That play does not get made except for Ted Johnson."

Johnson retired before the 2005 NFL season after sustaining many documented and undocumented concussions during his career.

Career statistics

Post-playing career
In an interview with USA Today in 2005, Johnson indicated he would know the opposing team's private signals or audibles prior to the game in order to have a competitive advantage. He claims that he never knew the source of the confidential information.

On February 1, 2007, Johnson told the New York Times that he suffers from amphetamine addiction, depression and headaches related to post-concussion syndrome and Second Impact Syndrome. He placed some blame on his former coach Bill Belichick for pressuring him to participate in full contact practice drills three days after suffering a concussion in an exhibition game against the New York Giants in August 2002. Johnson reported that during the drills, he suffered a second concussion, and he argues that Belichick asked him to participate against the advice of the team's head trainer. Belichick denies these allegations.  Some thought Johnson's revelation was suspect based upon a December 20, 2006 column in the Boston Herald where columnist Michael Felger said Johnson told him that he would have considered playing for the Patriots in 2006 had they asked (in the wake of a season-ending injury to linebacker Junior Seau). However, in a February 14, 2007 interview on the Dennis and Callahan Show on WEEI, Johnson claimed he wasn't being serious when he said that, and in fact stated he said it sarcastically.

On January 28, 2009, he discussed his problems with concussions sustained during his pro football career and the impact it had on his life in a CNN article. He indicated he was very inactive for two years following his retirement, barely leaving the house, and described those as bad days. He described himself as still occasionally suffering from anger, depression, and throbbing headaches. The implication was that he had since improved; however, no details were provided.

Personal
Johnson served as an adjunct professor for two years at Suffolk University in the Boston area.
In 1984, Ted Johnson Sr., his father, and Sylvia Johnson, his stepmother, opened The Original Rib Tickler barbecue restaurant in Tomball, TX. He currently resides in Massachusetts with  his longtime girlfriend.

Sports radio
Johnson spent the 2005 season as a football analyst for Boston television station WBZ-TV, but resigned from the station in 2006.

Johnson served as a co-host of "The Triple Threat" afternoon show on KILT (SportsRadio 610) in Houston. During his radio sports talk show on March 21, 2013, he was asked who was the ugliest wife in the NFL. He named Bianca Wilfork, wife of his former teammate Vince Wilfork. After receiving widespread criticism for his comment, including from Wilfork, Johnson issued an apology. Johnson left the Triple Threat and SportsRadio 610 in summer 2018 to return to the northeastern US.

In December 2018, 98.5 The Sports Hub in Boston hired Johnson.

References

Further reading

1972 births
Living people
American football linebackers
Colorado Buffaloes football players
New England Patriots players
Sportspeople from Carlsbad, California
Players of American football from California
People from Weston, Massachusetts
Sportspeople from Alameda, California
Sportspeople from Middlesex County, Massachusetts
Ed Block Courage Award recipients